Ismail ibn Musa Menk (born 27 June 1975) is a Zimbabwean Islamic scholar, best known as Mufti Menk. He is the Grand Mufti of Zimbabwe's Muslim community, which makes up roughly 1% of the country's total population, and head of the fatwa department for the Council of Islamic Scholars of Zimbabwe.

Menk was named one of The 500 Most Influential Muslims in the world by the Royal Aal al-Bayt Institute for Islamic Thought in Jordan in 2013, 2014 and 2017.

Early life 

Menk was born on 27 June 1975 in Harare to Gujarati Indian parents from the Bharuchi Vohra Patel community, being son of Maulana Musa Ibrahim Menk, a Muslim preacher in Zimbabwe. Mufti Menk is able to speak Gujarati Urdu, due to his parents being migrants from India, as common with the Bharachi Vohra community where he undertook his initial studies with his father, Moulana Musa, memorizing the Quran and learning Arabic. He went to St. John's College (Harare) for senior school. He then completed his religious education and Mufti course from Kantharia Darul Uloom located in Gujarat, India. Menk has been identified as a Deobandi as well as a Salafi by different sources, though he has not publicly acknowledged his involvement in either movement.

Views 
Menk opposes terrorism and has pledged his aid in curbing religious extremism in the Maldives. On 31 March 2018, he urged Liberian Muslims to avoid Muslim—Christian violence, arguing that Muslims and Christians are brothers and sisters from one father, the prophet Adam. He blames western media for misleading the world that Muslims are terrorists. According to Gulf News, Menk said that everyone on this earth is a part of a family and has one maker, therefore, no one has the right to force any belief or faith on another.

Works 
In 2018 he published a collection of his sayings as a book titled Motivational Moments and in 2019 published the second edition, titled Motivational Moments 2.

Awards and recognition 
Menk was honoured with an Honorary Doctorate of Social Guidance by Aldersgate College, Philippines and its collaborative partner Aldersgate College – Dublin, Ireland on 16 April 2016.
KSBEA 2015 Awards – Global Leadership Award in Social Guidance was awarded by the Cochin Herald.
 He was listed as one of The 500 Most Influential Muslims in 2014 and 2017.

Pakistan visit 
Menk visited Pakistan in September 2022 to highlight flood-hit areas of Sindh, Pakistan.

Controversies

Travel bans 
On 31 October 2017, Singapore banned Menk from its borders because it believes he expresses views incompatible with its multicultural laws and policies. According to the Straits Times, he has asserted that "it is blasphemous for Muslims to greet believers of other faiths during festivals such as Christmas or Deepavali". Singapore's Ministry of Home Affairs said in a statement that its decision to reject Menk's application for a short-term work pass stemmed from his "segregationist and divisive teachings". The Majlisul Ulama Zimbabwe, Menk's own institution, released a statement to express "regret and dismay" regarding the ban. It said that Menk was an "asset to multi‐cultural, multi‐religious Zimbabwe" and that viewers should "listen to his sermons in full" and not "edited clips of a few minutes" to see the moderate path he has chosen. Mufti Menk actually addressed this issue in a youtube video of his, in which he clarifies that he actually said, that you must not force your beliefs onto others.

In November 2018, the Danish government banned Menk from entering its borders for 2 years.

Homophobia
The Huffington Post has described Menk as an "openly homophobic Islamic preacher" who has denounced the act of homosexuality as "filthy". In 2013, he was due to visit six British universities – Oxford, Leeds, Leicester, Liverpool, Cardiff and Glasgow – but the speaking tour was cancelled after student unions and university officials expressed concern about his views. Menk's controversial statement included these words: "How can you engage in acts of immorality with the same sex?... The Qur'an clearly says it is wrong what you are doing... Allah speaks about how filthy this is... With all due respect to the animals, homosexuals are worse than animals."

See also 
 Zakir Naik
 Omar Suleiman (imam)
 Bilal Philips
 Yusuf Estes
 Hamza Yusuf
 Abu Ammaar Yasir Qadhi
 Abdurraheem Green
 Khalid Yasin

References

External links

 
 

Living people
Zimbabwean Sunni Muslims
Zimbabwean religious leaders
21st-century imams
Quran reciters
21st-century Muslim theologians
Islamic University of Madinah alumni
Muftis
1975 births
People from Harare
Islamic television preachers
Hanbalis
21st-century Muslim scholars of Islam